Parasclerocoelus is a genus of flies belonging to the family Lesser Dung flies.

Species
P. mediospinosus (Duda, 1925)

References

Sphaeroceridae
Diptera of Australasia
Diptera of Africa
Diptera of South America
Brachycera genera